Loze may refer to:

People
 Henri-Auguste Lozé, French politician

Settlements
 Lože, Laško, Slovenia
 Loze, Tarn-et-Garonne, Occitanie, France
 Lože, Vipava, Slovenia

Mountains
 Col de la Loze, mountain in the French Alps
 Loze Mountain, Antarctica

See also
 Lojze, a given name